The 2022 European derecho was a violent derecho which resulted in heavy wind on the French island of Corsica and in parts of northern Italy, Austria, Slovenia, and southern Czech Republic on 18 August 2022 which traveled over 1,000 km. The event resulted in 12 fatalities, and at least 116 others have been injured.

Meteorological history 

A Mesoscale Convective System (MCS) formed during the night from 17 to 18 August over the northern Balearic Islands and then rapidly moved towards the northeast, hitting Corsica early in the morning. The weather radar images show that the line of thunderstorms gradually arched an became a bow echo with the descent of the mid-level jet on the western flank of the MCS, producing powerful gusts of wind at the surface. The system affected Northern Italy afterward and Austria, all within a 12-hour period.

Météo-France was criticized for only triggering an Orange Vigilance by the morning, after the first reports of wind. Even if, according to some specialists, a numerical weather prediction simulation was predicting such an exceptional event, a spokesman for Météo-France defended the organization by saying that not all did because they do not yet represent these very localized phenomena well enough.

Impact

Corsica
In Corsica, at least five people died and 20 were injured. Four injuries were serious, and 125 water rescues were also required.

At one point, it was believed that 350 people were missing, but all have since been found alive.

Northern Italy
In Italy, two people were killed by falling trees in Tuscany. At least 41 others were injured in the region. Masonry on the belltower of St Mark's Basilica in Venice was damaged. In Piombino, the wind spun a ferris wheel out of control, detaching at least one of the empty cabins.

Austria
In Austria, five people died and 14 were injured, mostly by falling trees.

Slovenia
In Slovenia, at least four people were injured.

See also
 Weather of 2022
 List of derecho events

References

2022 meteorology
2022 natural disasters
Derecho
August 2022 events in Austria
August 2022 events in the Czech Republic
August 2022 events in France
August 2022 events in Italy
August 2022 events in Slovenia
Derechos